Craig McKenna (born 5 February 1991) is a Scottish freestyle wrestler.

Born in Glasgow, Scotland, he represented Scotland at the 2010 Commonwealth Games, New Delhi in the 55 kg category placing 7th.

Achievements

References
  on Commonwealth Games Scotland
 Scottishwrestling.org on Scottish Wrestling Association

1991 births
Living people
Sportspeople from Glasgow
Scottish male wrestlers
British male sport wrestlers
Wrestlers at the 2010 Commonwealth Games
Commonwealth Games competitors for Scotland